Grace Theological Seminary (GTS) is a conservative evangelical Christian seminary located in Winona Lake, Indiana.  GTS is now part of Grace College & Seminary and is associated with Charis Fellowship, before 2018 known as the Fellowship of Grace Brethren Churches.  Alva J. McClain, the first president, founded the seminary in 1937. Its mission statement is: "Grace Theological Seminary is a learning community dedicated to teaching, training, and transforming the whole person for local church and global ministry."  The seminary received school accreditation by the North Central Association and has been awarded accreditation by the Association of Theological Schools in the United States and Canada.

History of Grace Theological Seminary
Grace Theological Seminary's early beginnings were from the roots of the Schwarzenau Brethren in Schwarzenau, Germany whose beliefs were Anabaptist and Pietistic.

Notable alumni
 Robert Clouse (professor), Professor Emeritus at Indiana State University, author and leading expert in millennial thought and eschatological studies
 Gary G. Cohen, President Emeritus of Cohen Theological Seminary
 John Dekker, missionary to the Dani people
 David Dockery, Chancellor and Former President of Trinity International University
 Louie Giglio, Pastor of Passion City Church, Speaker/Founder of Passion Movement, Author
 Homer Kent, author, theologian.
 Mark Keough, incoming Republican member of the Texas House of Representatives, pastor in The Woodlands, Texas
 Rolland D. McCune, Systematic theologian and former President of Detroit Baptist Theological Seminary
 J. Ramsey Michaels, Professor and theologian
 John C. Whitcomb, Old Testament theologian and young Earth creationist.

Publications
Between 1980 and 1991 the seminary published the Grace Theological Journal.

See also
Billy Sunday, evangelist who lived in Winona Lake, Indiana

References

External links
Grace Theological Seminary (official site)

Seminaries and theological colleges in Indiana
Evangelical seminaries and theological colleges in the United States
Educational institutions established in 1937
Education in Kosciusko County, Indiana
1937 establishments in Indiana